Crunchfish is a deep tech company developing a Digital Cash platform for Banks, Payment Services and CBDC implementations and Gesture Interaction technology for AR/VR and automotive industry. Crunchfish is listed on Nasdaq First North Growth Market since 2016, with headquarters in Malmö, Sweden and with subsidiary in India.

External links 
Kinect-style motion tracking for smartphones & tablets promises Crunchfish
Look Ma! More Gesture Control Tech For Phones
Active 3D Technology by Crunchfish Demonstrated on a Samsung Nexus S
CRUNCHFISH RAISES €2.3M IN FUNDING
Investor Forum:Crunchfish
Investor Forum
20 ınnovatıons for tomorrow´s world
Crunchfish boot at GDC 2013
Crunchfish at GDC
New innovations to Innovative Sweden
Malmö-based @crunchfish receives €2.4M investment Via @OresundStartups
JOAKIM NYDEMARK NEW CEO AT CRUNCHFISH AB
Company Overview of Crunchfish AB
Setterwalls has assisted investors with investment in Crunchfish
Crunchfish Raises €2.4 Million For Touchless Device Interaction
List of mobile phones with HD display List of full HD display enabled smartphones
Gionee Elife E6 and the birth of a mobile phone
Gionee Elife E6 Hands On: First Look
Gionee Elife E6 Price in India is Rs 26,366
Shejk och Helsingborgsprofiler satsar på mobilteknik
Teknik för att interagera med mobiler genom gester från Qualcomm och svenska Crunchfish
Så skapar du ett innovativt företag
Snabba ryck hos Crunchfish
Här är svenskarna som ska charma MWC
De är nominerade till årets Guldmobiler
Svensk innovationskraft på Mobile World Congress i Barcelona
Mobile World Congress 2013
Veckan på GDC: Möten, spelgränssnitt och lättklädda kvinnor 
Kineser köpte rörelseteknik av Crunchfish
Octoshape and Crunchfish Solidify Mobile Partnership
Crunchfish raises 20m SEK to accelerate the roll-out of its mobile touchless technology
Crunchfish.com
Crunchfish Touchless Generation
Crunchfish Twitter Channel
Crunchfish Youtube Channel
Crunchfish Facebook Channel
Demo of Crunchfish A3D™ technology at Youtube

Computer hardware companies
Middleware
Video game development companies
Gesture recognition
Video game companies of Sweden